Owe Jonsson (23 November 1940 – 29 September 1962) was a Swedish sprinter, ice hockey player and bandy player.

Jonsson mostly competed in 100–400 m sprint events, winning seven national titles in 1960–1962. His favorite distance was 200 m, in which he broke the Swedish national record six times and won the European champion title in Belgrade in September 1962. Less than two weeks after that he died in a car accident on the road between his hometown, Växjö and Alvesta. A street near the athletics track in Växjö is named after him. Besides athletics, Jonsson also played ice hockey and bandy for Nässjö IF.

References

1940 births
1962 deaths
People from Växjö
Swedish male sprinters
Road incident deaths in Sweden
European Athletics Championships medalists
Sportspeople from Kronoberg County
20th-century Swedish people